The Deer Lodge County Courthouse, in Anaconda, Montana, was built in 1898.  It was listed on the National Register of Historic Places in 1978.

It was designed by architects Bell & Kent (Charles E. Bell and John N. Kent of Helena) and was built by contractors Dolan & Hamill.

It has an eight part dome.

It is located on a low hill at the south end of Main St., on Alternate U.S. Route 10.

References

External links

County courthouses in Montana
National Register of Historic Places in Deer Lodge County, Montana
Government buildings completed in 1898
1898 establishments in Montana
Anaconda, Montana
Courthouses on the National Register of Historic Places in Montana
Government buildings with domes